Jervis is a variant of the name Jarvis. It derives from the personal name Gervase; the element geri meaning spear. Other spellings of the name include Jervoise, and Gervis.

Given name
 Jervis Burdick (1889–1962), American track and field athlete
 Jervis Drummond (born 1976), Costa Rican footballer
 Jervis Johnson, games designer for Games Workshop, Nottingham
 Jervis McEntee (1828–1891), American painter

Surname
 Billy Jervis (born 1942), English former professional footballer
 Edward Jervis Jervis, 2nd Viscount St Vincent (1767–1859)
 Jake Jervis (born 1991), English footballer
 John Jervis, 1st Earl of St Vincent (1735–1823), admiral in the Royal Navy
 John B. Jervis (1795–1885), American railroad engineer
 Richie Jervis (born 1976), English cricketer
 Robert Jervis (1940–2021), professor of international affairs at Columbia University
 Simon Swynfen Jervis (born 9 January 1943), art historian
 Thomas Jervis (judge) (1770–1838), English judge
 William Jervis (cricketer, born 1827) (1827–1909), English lawyer and cricketer
 William Jervis (cricketer, born 1839) (1839–1920), English cricketer

See also
 Jervis (disambiguation)
 Jarvis (name)

References